The 196th Ohio Infantry Regiment, sometimes 196th Ohio Volunteer Infantry (or 196th OVI) was an infantry regiment in the Union Army during the American Civil War.

Service
The 196th Ohio Infantry was organized at Camp Chase in Columbus, Ohio, and mustered in March 25, 1865, for one year service under the command of Colonel Robert Patterson Kennedy.

The regiment left Ohio for Winchester, Virginia, March 26.  It was assigned to 2nd Brigade, 2nd Provisional Division, Army of the Shenandoah.  Performed duties at Winchester until July, then moved to Baltimore, Maryland, and served garrison duty there and at Fort Delaware until September.

The 196th Ohio Infantry mustered out of service September 11, 1865, at Baltimore, Maryland.

Casualties
The regiment lost a total of 25 enlisted men during service, all due to disease.

Commanders
 Colonel Robert Patterson Kennedy

Notable members
 Colonel Robert Patterson Kennedy - U.S. Representative from Ohio, 1887-1891

See also

 List of Ohio Civil War units
 Ohio in the Civil War

References
 Dyer, Frederick H. A Compendium of the War of the Rebellion (Des Moines, IA:  Dyer Pub. Co.), 1908.
 Ohio Roster Commission. Official Roster of the Soldiers of the State of Ohio in the War on the Rebellion, 1861–1865, Compiled Under the Direction of the Roster Commission (Akron, OH: Werner Co.), 1886–1895.
 Reid, Whitelaw. Ohio in the War: Her Statesmen, Her Generals, and Soldiers (Cincinnati, OH: Moore, Wilstach, & Baldwin), 1868. 
Attribution

External links
 Ohio in the Civil War: 196th Ohio Volunteer Infantry by Larry Stevens
 National flag of the 196th Ohio Infantry
 Regimental flag of the 196th Ohio Infantry
 Flank marker of the 196th Ohio Infantry

Military units and formations established in 1865
Military units and formations disestablished in 1865
Units and formations of the Union Army from Ohio
1865 establishments in Ohio